|}

The Lillie Langtry Stakes is a Group 2 flat horse race in Great Britain open to fillies and mares aged three years or older. It is run at Goodwood over a distance of 1 mile and 6 furlongs (2,816 metres), and it is scheduled to take place each year in late July or early August.

History
The event was established in 2003, and it was initially titled the Gladness Stakes. It was named after Gladness, a successful racehorse whose victories included the Goodwood Cup in 1958. The inaugural running was classed at Listed level.

The race was renamed and promoted to Group 3 status in 2004. It was named after Lillie Langtry, a British actress who was a mistress of King Edward VII. Langtry owned Merman, the winner of the Goodwood Cup in 1899.  As a woman she was not allowed to register the horse under her own name and used the pseudonym Mr Jersey, a reference to her place of birth.  In 1907 Langtry became Lady de Bathe when her husband succeeded to the baronetcy following the death of his father.  The race was upgraded again to Group 2 status from the 2018 running.

The Lillie Langtry Stakes was sponsored by Moët Hennessy from 2008 to 2010, and during this period it was known as the Moët Hennessy Fillies' Stakes. It was sponsored by BlackRock and run as the iShares Fillies' Stakes in 2011-12. In 2013 it was renamed the Blackrock Fillies' Stakes, and in 2014 it was sponsored by Sterling Insurance. From 2015 to 2017 the race was sponsored by Markel Insurance.

The race is currently held on the final day of the five-day Glorious Goodwood meeting.

Records

Most successful horse (2 wins):
 Tartouche – 2005, 2006
 Wild Coco - 2012, 2013
 Enbihaar - 2019, 2020

Leading jockey (3 wins):
 Seb Sanders – Moments of Joy (2003), Tartouche (2005, 2006)
 Tom Queally - Sevenna (2009), Wild Coco (2012, 2013)
 Jim Crowley - Missunited (2014), Enbihaar (2019, 2020)

Leading trainer (3 wins):
 John Gosden - California (2016), Enbihaar (2019,2020)

Winners

See also
 Horse racing in Great Britain
 List of British flat horse races

References

 Racing Post:
 galopp-sieger.de – Lillie Langtry Stakes.
 ifhaonline.org – International Federation of Horseracing Authorities – Lillie Langtry Stakes (2019).
 pedigreequery.com – Lillie Langtry Stakes – Goodwood.

Flat races in Great Britain
Goodwood Racecourse
Long-distance horse races for fillies and mares
Recurring sporting events established in 2003
2003 establishments in England